Macroecology is the subfield of ecology that deals with the study of relationships between organisms and their environment at large spatial scales to characterise and explain statistical patterns of abundance, distribution and diversity.  The term was coined in a small monograph published in Spanish in 1971 by Guillermo Sarmiento and Maximina Monasterio, two Venezuelan researchers working in tropical savanna ecosystems and later used by James Brown of the University of New Mexico and Brian Maurer of Michigan State University in a 1989 paper in Science.

Macroecology approaches the idea of studying ecosystems using a "top down" approach.  It seeks understanding through the study of the properties of the system as a whole; Kevin Gaston and Tim Blackburn make the analogy to seeing the forest for the trees.

Macroecology examines how global development in climate change affect wildlife populations. Classic ecological questions amenable to study through the techniques of macroecology include questions of species richness, latitudinal gradients in species diversity, the species-area curve, range size, body size, and species abundance.  For example, the relationship between abundance and range size (why species that maintain large local population sizes tend to be widely distributed, while species that are less abundant tend to have restricted ranges) has received much attention.

References

External links 
Scientific journals covering macroecology:
 Global Ecology and Biogeography 
 Ecography 
 Diversity and Distribution
 Evolutionary Ecology Research

Biosphere
Subfields of ecology
Systems ecology